Boleslaw (Bolek) Goldman (born 29 September 1938, in Puławy, Poland) is an Emeritus Professor in the Sackler Faculty of Medicine in Tel Aviv University.

He was the personal physician of Prime Ministers of Israel David Ben-Gurion, Yitzhak Rabin and Ariel Sharon as well as of Moshe Dayan and many others.

Served for 14 years as the Director of the Sheba Medical Center. 
From 2009 to 2022 he served as Chairman of the Board of Directors of the Gertner Institute for Epidemiology and Health Policy Research. 
In the years 2010–2016, he served as President of the Center for Academic Studies, Or Yehuda.
In the years 1974-2004 was the director of the Institute of Human Genetics at the Chaim Sheba Medical Center, Tel Hashomer.

Founded the Supreme Helsinki Committee for Medical Experiments in Humans (Genetic Research), and served as its chairman from 1997–2010, on behalf of Ministry of Health.

In 2002, he received the David Ben-Gurion Award for Lifetime Achievement.

Clinical experience 
In the years 1968–1973 he specialized in internal medicine in Tel Hashomer Hospital, and in 1973 he was certified as a specialist in internal medicine. 
In 1987 he was certified as a medical management specialist and in 1988 he was certified as a medical genetics specialist. 
From 1974 to 2004, he was the director of the Human Genetic Institute at Sheba Medical Center, Tel Hashomer.

Academic career
Between 1974 and 1978 he was a senior lecturer at the School of Medicine at Tel Aviv University, between the years 1978–1985 he was an associate professor, and between the years 1985–2006 he was a full professor and from 2006, he is professor emeritus.

Management

Public activity 
From 1980 to 1985 he served as a member of the Board of Directors of the United States-Israel Education Foundation (Fulbright Program). In 1985 he was appointed Chairman of the Board and served in that capacity for three years.

Founded the Supreme Helsinki Committee for Medical Experiments in Humans (Genetic Research) and was its first chair between the years 1997-2010. 

In 2004–2012 he was a member of the National Council for Bioethics.

Served on the Board of Directors of Tel Aviv University from 2009–2010. Since 1983, he has been member of the board of directors of the Moshe Dayan Center for Middle Eastern and African Studies at Tel Aviv University.

From 2003 he is a member of the board of directors of the Tel Aviv Museum.
In the years 2005–2009 - member of the board of trustees of the Bezalel Academy of Arts and Design, Jerusalem.
From 2005 to 2021 he was a member of the board of directors of the Health and Environment Foundation. 

From 2011 to 2014 he was a member of the board of directors and from 2014 to 2020 member of the executive committee at Yad Vashem.

Publications 
Wrote about 200 articles in the scientific press in the fields of medicine, genetics and epidemiology.  

Member of the editorial board of the Journal of Health Law and Bioethics - Journal of Health Law and Bioethics of the Ono Academic College.

Awards and honors
In 2002 he won the "David Ben-Gurion Prize" for a lifetime achievement in medicine.

References

Israeli medical researchers
Israeli physicians
Israeli business executives
1937 births
Living people
The Hebrew University-Hadassah Medical School alumni
Academic staff of Tel Aviv University

1938 births